The 1965 United States Grand Prix was a Formula One motor race held on October 3, 1965, at the Watkins Glen Grand Prix Race Course in Watkins Glen, New York. It was race 9 of 10 in both the 1965 World Championship of Drivers and the 1965 International Cup for Formula One Manufacturers. The 110-lap race was won by BRM driver Graham Hill after he started from pole position. Dan Gurney finished second for the Brabham team and his teammate Jack Brabham came in third.

Summary
In the last year of the 1.5-liter formula, Jim Clark had clinched his second Drivers' Championship (as well as winning the Indianapolis 500) before the teams arrived in North America for the season's last two races. Once again, however, it was Graham Hill and BRM who reigned at The Glen, winning for the third year in a row. Hill took pole, win and fastest lap, finishing twelve seconds ahead of the Brabhams of Dan Gurney and Sir Jack.

The weekend was cold, windy (30 mph), and often wet. In practice, Jim Clark—a Scot, no less—wore a sweater over his driving suit. Ferrari was missing the previous year's World Champion, John Surtees, who had been injured in a sports car race in Canada the previous week. Hill's new BRM teammate, Jackie Stewart, who had broken Clark's string of five consecutive victories with his first Grand Prix win at Monza three weeks before, was running at The Glen for the first time, as was Austrian Jochen Rindt. American Bob Bondurant was making his Formula One debut.

The track was shrouded in mist on Friday, as Clark switched back and forth between his Lotus, with a 32-valve Climax engine, and teammate Mike Spence's 16-valve model. After bending the suspension on Spence's car by hitting the curb in 'The 90', Clark got back in his car and did a 1:12.7, which was fastest of the day until Hill beat it by two-tenths.

On Saturday, sunny but still cold, Clark and Hill continued their battle. Hill posted a 1:11.25 in the BRM, and Clark just failed to match him in his 32-valve Lotus, getting down to 1:11.35 before he sheared two teeth on a timing gear. Again, the Scot took teammate Spence's car, and he recorded a remarkable time of 1:11.16 to complete the duel. Overnight, however, the 32-valve engine was repaired, and when Clark decided to use it in the race, he would have to start from the second spot, alongside Hill. American Richie Ginther used the spare Honda to grab third spot, as the powerful V–12 made him the fastest car down the straight. The top six on the grid were Hill, Clark, Ginther, Spence, Lorenzo Bandini's Ferrari and Stewart.

It rained on Sunday morning, but a strong wind dried the track in time for the start, and 60,000 fans watched with hoods and parkas against the changing conditions. Hill jumped into an early lead, trailed by Clark and Ginther. Stewart charged up from the third row and moved inside Ginther in the Esses, but the Honda pinched the gap closed, forcing Stewart into the curb and bending his suspension. Stewart continued, while the stunned Ginther dropped back to eighth, but the throttle cable on Stewart's car split and he limped around to the pits. By the time he rejoined the race, the rain had returned, making his bent suspension too big of a handicap, and he retired.

On the second lap, Clark took the lead from Hill, as the two pulled away from Bandini, Spence, Gurney and Brabham. Three laps later, Hill regained the lead, and the two British World Champions dueled until lap 12, when Hill's BRM appeared alone, and Clark coasted into the pits with a broken piston. The group of four following the leaders had been battling hard, as Spence was twice forced off the road by Bandini, and retired on lap six with a broken timing chain. Hill now led Gurney by 14 seconds, followed by Bandini and Brabham.

By lap 24, Hill led by almost half a lap. Then, a sudden shower soaked the track as the leader began lap 37. In 'The Loop' at the end of the back straight, Hill was caught out by the slippery surface and went straight on into the grass, then bounced along for 200 yards before regaining the track. Hill's Dunlop tires were two seconds per lap slower in the wet than the Brabham team's Goodyears, and, aided by the off-track excursion, Gurney and Jack Brabham were able to close the sizable gap. Gurney pulled right up on the BRM's tailpipes, but in his zeal, he overdid a corner and allowed teammate Brabham by into second. Now, it was team leader Brabham's turn to have a go, and he moved ahead of Hill on the outside of 'The 90,' right before the pits. Hill had been consistently taking corners with a late apex, then power-sliding the car around the outside of the turn's exit. Hill's wide line out of the corner again carried him to the edge of the track, and with Brabham on his left, he forced the two-time Champion off and into a slow 360 across the wet grass. Gurney was back in second, and Brabham rejoined, once again in third. Gurney may have been tempted to challenge for the lead again, but a slipping clutch caused him to think better of it.

With the track almost completely dry near the end of the race, Hill put his foot down and set the fastest lap of the afternoon on lap 105. He came home twelve seconds ahead for his second win of the year and the completion of a remarkable three-year run at The Glen. After the season, the Watkins Glen Grand Prix Corporation was awarded the Grand Prix Drivers Association's "Best Organized Race Award," the first of three times The Glen would receive the honor.

Classification

Qualifying

Race

Championship standings after the race

Drivers' Championship standings

Constructors' Championship standings

 Notes: Only the top five positions are included for both sets of standings. Only best 6 results counted toward the championship. Numbers without parentheses are championship points, numbers in parentheses are total points scored.

References

Further reading
 Doug Nye (1978). The United States Grand Prix and Grand Prize Races, 1908-1977. B. T. Batsford. 
 "Grand Prix of the United States" (January, 1966). Road & Track, 36-38.

United States Grand Prix
United States Grand Prix
United States Grand Prix
United States Grand Prix
United States Grand Prix